Charlie Marendaz (born 2 September 1935) is a former Australian rules footballer who played with North Melbourne in the Victorian Football League (VFL).

Marendaz played six senior games for North Melbourne, in the 1956 VFL season.

He also made many appearances for Daylesford and won the Henderson Medal in 1966.

References

External links
 
 

1935 births
Australian rules footballers from Victoria (Australia)
North Melbourne Football Club players
Daylesford Football Club players
Living people